The Hsinchu Museum of Military Dependents Village is a museum about the Military dependents' village in North District, Hsinchu City, Taiwan.

History
The museum was established by the Cultural Affairs Bureau of Hsinchu City Government on 28 December 2002.

After the civil war between the Kuomintang (also known as the Chinese Nationalist Party) and the Communist Party in 1949, the Nationalist Government retreated to Taiwan. The military, civilian, and government personnel of all provinces were forced to move to settle in Taiwan. According to statistics, from 1945 to 1950, nearly 2 million soldiers and civilians from all parts of mainland China moved to Taiwan. In order to solve the housing problem caused by the population explosion, the Nationalist Government began to build houses or arrange dormitories, and the new residents were grouped in a certain range with the military service, occupation, and characteristics, which is now known as the “Military Dependents Village”.

Architecture
In Hsinchu, there were initially 47 villages, and the proportion is quite high.

Exhibitions
The museum houses historic relics and information regarding the buildings in the museum. The museum also regularly hold various exhibitions.

Transportation
The museum is accessible within walking distance north from Hsinchu Station of the Taiwan Railways.

See also
 List of museums in Taiwan

References

2002 establishments in Taiwan
Local museums in Taiwan
Military and war museums in Taiwan
Museums established in 2002
Museums in Hsinchu
Military dependents' village, Taiwan